Morpheus is a role-playing game published by Rapport Games in 1990.

Description
Morpheus is a universal system set in the future, when player characters in the Morpheus Mind Park link their minds into virtual-reality systems that enable them to play any type of character. The rules enable player characters to change their statistics and abilities, even in the middle of combat. The game includes four players' aid sheets: a character record sheet, character attack powers sheet, character defense powers sheet, and "cheat sheet" summary for quick character creation.

Publication history
Morpheus was published by Rapport Games in 1990 as a book with four sheets.

Reception

Reviews
Voyages to the Worlds of SF Gaming (Issue 12 - Oct 1990)

References

Role-playing games introduced in 1990
Universal role-playing games